Mirzələr is a village in the Shusha District of Azerbaijan.

References 

Populated places in Shusha District